Cyril Ngonge (born 26 May 2000) is a Belgian professional footballer who plays for Italian  club Hellas Verona as a winger or forward.

Club career 
Ngonge is a youth exponent from Club Brugge. He made his senior debut on 2 December 2018 in the Belgian Pro League against Standard Liège. He replaced Emmanuel Dennis after 20 minutes.

On 1 September 2019, Ngonge was loaned out to Jong PSV for the 2019–20 season.

After his return, he was directly sold to Dutch Eredivisie club RKC Waalwijk. There, he developed into a starter in his first season and scored his first goal for the club in his fourth game, a 2–2 draw against Feyenoord.

On 19 January 2023, Ngonge joined Italian Serie A club Hellas Verona.

Personal life
Ngonge's father, Michel Ngonge, was also a professional footballer and represented the DR Congo national team. as well as Watford F.C. in the Premier League.

References

External links
 
 Career stats & Profile - Voetbal International

2000 births
Living people
Belgian people of Democratic Republic of the Congo descent
Belgian footballers
Association football forwards
Belgium youth international footballers
Club Brugge KV players
Jong PSV players
RKC Waalwijk players
FC Groningen players
Hellas Verona F.C. players
Belgian Pro League players
Eerste Divisie players
Eredivisie players
Belgian expatriate footballers
Belgian expatriate sportspeople in the Netherlands
Expatriate footballers in the Netherlands
Belgian expatriate sportspeople in Italy
Expatriate footballers in Italy